The 2015 SMU Mustangs football team represented Southern Methodist University in the 2015 NCAA Division I FBS football season. They were led by first-year head coach Chad Morris. They played their home games at Gerald J. Ford Stadium in University Park, Texas, an enclave of Dallas, and were members of the Western Division of the American Athletic Conference. They finished the season 2–10, 1–7 in American Athletic play to finish in a tie for fifth place in the Western Division.

Schedule

Source:

Game summaries

Baylor

North Texas

TCU

James Madison

East Carolina

Houston

South Florida

Tulsa

Temple

Navy

Tulane

Memphis

Roster

References

SMU
SMU Mustangs football seasons
SMU Mustangs football